Perhaps a Poet (Swedish: Kanske en diktare) is a 1933 Swedish drama film directed by Lorens Marmstedt and starring Gösta Ekman, Gunnar Olsson and Karin Kavli.

Cast
 Gösta Ekman as Filip, rockvaktmästare
 Gunnar Olsson as Viding
 Karin Kavli as 	Jane
 Hjalmar Peters as 	Kurtz
 Hugo Björne as 	Domaren
 Hjördis Petterson as 	Cigarrfröken
 Hugo Tranberg as Källarmästaren
 Olof Widgren as Notarien
 Eric Abrahamsson as 	Irate Guest at the Restaurant 
 Alice Carlsson as 	Restaurant Guest Putting on Lipstick 
 Calle Flygare as Waiter 
 Bengt Janzon as 	Bisittare i rätten 
 Helge Kihlberg as Older Waiter 
 Ernst Marcusson as Court Secretary 
 Holger Sjöberg as 	Fat Guest at the Restaurant

References

Bibliography 
 Qvist, Per Olov & von Bagh, Peter. Guide to the Cinema of Sweden and Finland. Greenwood Publishing Group, 2000.

External links 
 

1933 films
Swedish drama films
1933 drama films
1930s Swedish-language films
Films directed by Lorens Marmstedt
Swedish black-and-white films
1930s Swedish films